Parateuthis tunicata, the only known member of the genus Parateuthis, is the scientific name currently given to a species of squid based on a single specimen. The validity of Parateuthis and of P. tunicata is uncertain. The sole specimen was found in the Antarctic Ocean, and is held in the repository at the Museum für Naturkunde in Berlin, Germany.

References

External links

Squid
Monotypic mollusc genera
Cephalopod genera
Taxa named by Johannes Thiele (zoologist)